A pulsar is a type of star.

Pulsar may also refer to:

Arts and entertainment
 Pulsar (band), a French progressive rock band
 Pulsar (comics), several uses
 Pulsar (film), a 2010 Belgian film 
 Pulsar (video game), a 1981 arcade game
 The Pulsars, an American new wave/indie rock band

Businesses and products
 Pulsar (synthesizer), a music synthesizer by Creamware
 Pulsar (watch), a brand of watch and a division of Seiko Watch Corporation
 Pulsar Games, a defunct game company 
 IBM RS64-III or Pulsar, a 1990s IBM microprocessor
 PULSAR, a brand name of Yukon Optics

Transportation
 Aero Designs Pulsar, an American ultralight aircraft
 Bajaj Pulsar, an Indian motorcycle
 Nissan Pulsar, a Japanese small car
 Wright Pulsar, a British single-decker bus body
 Windtech Pulsar, a Spanish paraglider

Other uses
 Pulsar (grape), another name for the French wine grape Poulsard
 Pulsar (roller coaster), at Walibi Belgium 
 Pulsar, an Apache Software Foundation project

See also

 Pulstar (disambiguation)